Brendan James Stafford BSC (1 February 1915 – 16 July 1991) was an Irish cinematographer known for his work on British films and television. He also directed three films.

Selected filmography

Film
 Fortune Lane (1947)
 Paul Temple's Triumph (1950)
 Stranger at My Door (1950)
 The Wallet (1952)
 The Night Won't Talk (1952)
 The Armchair Detective (1952)
 Circumstantial Evidence (1952)
 Men Against the Sun (1952)
 Eight O'Clock Walk (1954)
 Bang! You're Dead (1954)
 Profile (1954)
 One Jump Ahead (1955)
 The Hostage (1956)
 The Hideout (1956)
 Date with Disaster (1957)
 There's Always a Thursday (1957)
 The Man Without a Body (1957)
 Witness in the Dark (1959)
 The Shakedown (1959)
 Your Money or Your Wife (March 1960)
 And Women Shall Weep (April 1960)
 Crossplot (1969)
 Clinic Exclusive (1972)

Television
 Fabian of the Yard (1954–56)
 The Invisible Man (1959)
 Danger Man (1960)
 Sir Francis Drake (1961–62)
 Man of the World (1962–63)
 The Sentimental Agent (1963)
 Danger Man (1964–66)
 The Prisoner (1967–68)
 The Saint (1968–69)
 UFO (1969–70)
 The Protectors (1972–74)

References

Bibliography
 Chibnall, Steve & McFarlane, Brian. The British 'B' Film. Palgrave MacMillan, 2009.

External links

1915 births
1991 deaths
British cinematographers
Irish cinematographers
British film directors
Irish film directors
Irish emigrants to the United Kingdom
Film people from Dublin (city)